Flemish (Vlaams) is a Low Franconian dialect cluster of the Dutch language. It is sometimes referred to as Flemish Dutch, Belgian Dutch, or Southern Dutch. Flemish is native to Flanders, a historical region in northern Belgium; it is spoken by Flemings, the dominant ethnic group of the region. Outside of Flanders, it is also spoken to some extent in French Flanders and the Dutch Zeelandic Flanders.

Terminology 
The term Flemish itself has become ambiguous. Nowadays, it is used in at least five ways, depending on the context. These include:
 An indication of Dutch written and spoken in Flanders including the Dutch standard language as well as the non-standardized dialects, including intermediate forms between vernacular dialects and the standard. Some linguists avoid the term Flemish in this context and prefer the designation Belgian-Dutch or South-Dutch  
 A synonym for the so-called intermediate language in Flanders region, the 
 An indication of the non-standardized dialects and regiolects of Flanders region
 An indication of the non-standardized dialects of only the former County of Flanders, i.e. the current provinces of West Flanders and East Flanders, Zeelandic Flanders and French Flanders 
 An indication of the non-standardized West Flemish dialects of the province of West Flanders, the Dutch Zeelandic Flanders and French  

MultiTree considers Flemish to include the four principal Dutch dialects in the Flemish region (Flanders): Brabantian, East Flemish, West Flemish and Limburgish as well as three other dialects. Glottolog considers Western Flemish to be a separate language, classified as a part of the Southwestern Dutch family together with the Zeelandic language. According to Glottolog, Western Flemish includes the dialects of French Flemish and West Flemish. Brabantian and East Flemish are classified as Dutch dialects, under the Central Southern Dutch dialect group. Ethnologue considers Limburgish and West Flemish to be separate (regional) languages.

Characteristics 
  
Dutch is the majority language in northern Belgium, being used in written language by three-fifths of the population of Belgium. It is one of the three national languages of Belgium, together with French and German, and is the only official language of the Flemish Region.

The various Dutch dialects spoken in Belgium contain a number of lexical and a good amount of grammatical features that distinguish them from the standard Dutch. Basic Dutch words can have a completely different meaning in Flemish or imply different context. As in the Netherlands, the pronunciation of Standard Dutch is affected by the native dialect of the speaker.

All Dutch dialect groups spoken in Belgium are spoken in adjacent areas of the Netherlands as well. East Flemish forms a continuum with both Brabantic and West Flemish. Standard Dutch is primarily based on the Hollandic dialect  (spoken in the Western provinces of the Netherlands) and to a lesser extent on Brabantian, which is the dominant dialect in Flanders, as well as in the south of the Netherlands.

Tussentaal
The supra-regional, semi-standardized colloquial form (mesolect) of Dutch spoken in Belgium uses the vocabulary and the sound inventory of the Brabantic dialects. It is often called an "in-between-language" or "intermediate language", intermediate between dialects and standard Dutch. Despite its name, Brabantian is the dominant contributor to the Flemish Dutch tussentaal.  

It is a rather informal variety of speech, which occupies an intermediate position between vernacular dialects and the standard language. It incorporates phonetic, lexical and grammatical elements not part of the standard language but drawn from local dialects.

It is a relatively new phenomenon that has been gaining popularity during the past decades. Some linguists note that it seems to be undergoing a process of (limited) standardisation or that it is evolving into a koiné variety.

Tussentaal is slowly gaining popularity in Flanders because it is used a lot in television dramas and comedies. Often, middle-class characters in a television series will be speaking tussentaal, lower-class characters use the dialect of the location where the show is set (such as Western Flanders), and upper-class characters will speak Standard Dutch. That has given tussentaal the status of normalcy in Flanders. It is slowly being accepted by the general population, but it has met with objections from writers and academics who argue that it dilutes the usage of Standard Dutch. Tussentaal is used in entertainment television but rarely in informative programmes (like the news), which normally use Flemish accents with standard Dutch vocabulary.

Belgicisms

A belgicism is a word or expression that occurs only in the Belgian variant of Dutch. Some are rarely used, others are used daily and are considered part of the Belgian-Dutch standard language. Many belgicisms are loanwords and words or expressions literally translated from French (also called gallicisms); others, in contrast, are actually remarkably purist, such as droogzwierder (a compound of Dutch droog "dry" and zwierder "spinner") meaning "spin dryer" (common standard Dutch: centrifuge, a loanword from French), and duimspijker (a compound of Dutch duim "thumb" and spijker "nail") meaning "thumbtack" (common standard Dutch: punaise, a loanword from French). Among the belgicisms, there are also many words that are considered obsolete, formal, or purist in standard Dutch. Moreover, many belgicisms have their origin in the Belgian official nomenclature. For example, misdaad "felony" is not a legal term in the Netherlands, but it is in Belgium.

Etymology

The name  was formed from a stem , with a suffix -ðr- attached.

See also 

 Belgian French
 Dutch in Belgium
 French Flemish, the West Flemish dialect as spoken in France
 Languages of Belgium 
 Zeelandic, a transitional dialect between West Flemish and Hollandic

References

External links 

Dutch dialects
Dutch language
Flanders